Louis-Philippe Ladouceur (born March 13, 1981) is a former American football long snapper who spent his entire 16 year career with the Dallas Cowboys. Born and raised in Montreal, Canada, he played college football for the California Golden Bears. He signed as an undrafted free agent with the National Football League's (NFL) New Orleans Saints in 2005, before joining the Dallas Cowboys that same year, playing for them for the next 16 seasons.

Ladouceur holds several longevity records for both the Cowboys and the NFL, including most consecutive games played in Cowboys history, most seasons played in Cowboys history, most consecutive games played by a longsnapper in NFL history, and most games played by a Canadian-born player.

Early years
Ladouceur attended Notre Dame High School in Montreal, Quebec. He went on to play as a defensive lineman for John Abbott College, which is a public college, where as a senior he recorded seven sacks, 48 tackles, and one fumble recovery.

He accepted a football scholarship from the University of California, Berkeley. He also received scholarship offers from Syracuse University and Michigan State University. In his first 2 seasons he appeared in only 5 games. As a junior, he was named the team's long snapper and was a key player on a special teams unit that did not allow a blocked kick in two straight years.

Ladouceur was selected in the fourth round of the 2004 CFL Draft by the Ottawa Renegades, but decided to return to school.

Professional career

New Orleans Saints
Ladouceur was signed as an undrafted free agent by the New Orleans Saints after the 2005 NFL Draft on April 27. He was waived on August 29.

Dallas Cowboys
After playing the third game of the 2005 season against the San Francisco 49ers, the Cowboys decided to stay the entire week in California, to better prepare for their next game against the Oakland Raiders. Because of issues they were having with rookie long snapper Jon Condo, the team decided to replace him with Ladouceur, who signed with the team on September 28.  In his NFL debut against the San Francisco 49ers, he snapped cleanly on five punts and two field goals. He finished his rookie season with clean snaps on 70 punts, 25 field goals and 28 PATs.

On February 14, 2008, he signed a five-year contract through the 2012 season. On February 28, 2013, he signed a new five-year contract. In 2014, he was added to the Pro Bowl as a "need player" for special teams purposes.

On March 18, 2018, Ladouceur re-signed with the Cowboys. On March 19, 2019, Ladouceur re-signed with the Cowboys.

On March 24, 2020, Ladouceur signed a one-year contract with the Cowboys. He tied the franchise record of playing in 16 seasons, shared with tight end Jason Witten. On December 13, 2020, he became just the 3rd player in NFL history to play 250 consecutive games for one team.  On December 20, he played in his 251st career NFL game, moving him past placekicker Eddie Murray as the most ever by a Canadian born player. He was congratulated by Canada's Prime Minister Justin Trudeau.

On March 15, 2021, it was reported in the media that the Cowboys would not re-sign Ladouceur to play for them in a 17th season. He was replaced with free agent acquisition Jake McQuaide.

Personal life
Ladouceur married his wife, Brooke Worthington, in April 2012. He became an American citizen in 2019 after starting the process in 2013.

He decided he was going to retire from the NFL in November 2021, but did not make his decision public until February 2022.

References

External links
California Golden Bears bio

1981 births
Living people
American football defensive linemen
American football long snappers
California Golden Bears football players
Canadian players of American football
Dallas Cowboys players
French Quebecers
Gridiron football people from Quebec
People from Pointe-Claire
Sportspeople from Montreal
Unconferenced Pro Bowl players
American people of French-Canadian descent